Wladyslaw Belza (17 October 1847 - 29 January 1913) was a Polish poet. He was born in Warsaw.

Works
 Katechizm Polskiego Dziecka (Polish Child’s Catechism), 1900
 Kto ty jesteś? Polak mały. Jaki znak twój? Orzeł biały (poem) (Who are you? I’m a young Pole. What’s your symbol? The white eagle.)

References

Further reading

External links
 
 
 Władysław Bełza at poezja.org (polish)

1847 births
1913 deaths
Writers from Warsaw
People from Warsaw Governorate